The 1897 South Carolina United States Senate election was a unanimous election of the Democratic nominee on January 26, 1897 to select the U.S. Senator from the state of South Carolina. The Democratic primary election was held on August 26, 1896 and September 9.  Prior to the ratification of the 17th Amendment to the United States Constitution, U.S. Senators were elected by the state legislature and not through the direct election by the people of the state.  However, the Democratic Party of South Carolina organized primary elections for the U.S. Senate beginning in 1896 and the General Assembly would confirm the choice of the Democratic voters.  Conservative Democratic Joseph H. Earle won the Democratic primary and was elected by the General Assembly for a six-year term.

Democratic primary
In 1896, Governor of South Carolina John Gary Evans entered the first ever election in the state of South Carolina for the U.S. Senate.  He had the backing of Senator Ben Tillman and much of the farming interests in the state.  However, the farmers' movement had largely run its course and the Tillmanite reform movement had angered a considerable number of voters in the state.  Conservative Joseph H. Earle and Newberry native John T. Duncan announced their candidacy's in opposition to Governor Evans.  In the primary on August 26 Evans emerged as the frontrunner, but did not garner over 50% of the vote and was forced to face Earle in a runoff election.  Those who had voted for Duncan threw their support to Earle and it provided him with the margin he needed for victory over Evans.

See also
List of United States senators from South Carolina
1896 and 1897 United States Senate elections
1896 United States House of Representatives elections in South Carolina
1896 South Carolina gubernatorial election

References

United States Senate
1897
South Carolina